Midsummer Night near Vejle Fjord is a painting by Harald Slott-Møller, dated 1904.

Analysis
It is a landscape painting, but can also be regarded as a portrait painting, since the artist's wife, Agnes Slott-Møller, certainly is the seated woman looking out over the Vejle Fjord on Midsummer night.

This painting is characterized by an unusual use of color, especially in the woman's prominent red cape. While Harald Slott-Møller's work was based on naturalism and symbolism, the surface and the colors are also considered to have symbolic significance in this painting.

Europeana 280 
In April 2016, this painting was selected as one of the ten most important artistic works from Denmark for the Europeana project.

References 

1904 paintings
20th-century paintings in Denmark
Paintings in the Vejle Museum of Art
Jutland